Chaunce is a surname. Notable people with the surname include:

John Chaunce (disambiguation), multiple people
Roger Chaunce (disambiguation), multiple people

See also
Chauncey (name)